The Dieter Hildebrandt Prize has been awarded by the city of Munich since 2016. The award honors German Kabarett artist Dieter Hildebrandt, who died in 2013. The annual prize honors ambitious political or decidedly socially critical cabaret. It is endowed with €10,000 and replaces the Cabaret Prize of the City of Munich. On proposal of a jury, the city council of Munich decides the winner.

Recipients
Source:

 2016: Claus von Wagner
 2017: Josef Hader
 2018: Andreas Rebers
 2019: Christine Prayon
 2020: Frank-Markus Barwasser
 2021: Sarah Bosetti
 2022:

References

External links

 

Awards established in 2016
German awards
2016 establishments in Germany
Culture in Munich